Whatever Will Be, Will Be is a 1995 Hong Kong musical and drama film directed by Jacob Cheung and starring Aaron Kwok and Kelly Chen, the latter in her debut film role.

Cast and roles
 Aaron Kwok as Shrimp Man (Lam Kwong-lee)
 Kelly Chen as Wing (Lee Ching-wan)
 Richard Ng as Wing's Dad
 Lee Pooi-suen
 Lam Long-hei as Roy
 Kung Wan-yiu
 Ma Lee
 Mau Tat
 Kam Chi-yung
 Michael Miu as Peter's dad
 Jamie Chik as Peter's mum
 Hui Fan as Sister school principal
 Nam Hung as Sister school vice principal
 Jimmy Wong as Michael
 Dolphin Chan as Chris
 Fiona Brockway as Dancers' audition judge
 Wong Man-ching
 Kingson Shek
 Cho Sai
 Cheung Chi-kwok Mr. Poon
 Chiu Mei-ling
 Lam Chak-kwan
 Leung Ka-chun
 Jacky Leung
 Kwong Wing-yan
 Leo
 leung Hoi-ling
 So Sing

External links
 Page describing the film
 

1995 films
1995 drama films
Hong Kong drama films
1990s Cantonese-language films
Films directed by Jacob Cheung
Films about educators
Films set in Hong Kong
Films shot in Hong Kong
1990s Hong Kong films